Lester "Lep" Long (July 12, 1888 – October 21, 1958) was a Major League Baseball pitcher. He played four games for the Philadelphia Athletics in 1911.

External links

1888 births
1958 deaths
Major League Baseball pitchers
Philadelphia Athletics players
Haverhill Hustlers players
Lafayette Leopards baseball players
Baseball players from New Jersey
Sportspeople from Summit, New Jersey